Rafael Antonio Orellano Hernandez (born April 28, 1973) is a former pitcher who played for the Nippon Ham Fighters of Nippon Professional Baseball from 1998 to 2000.

Playing career

American minor leagues
The left-handed hurler began his professional baseball career in 1993, playing in the Boston Red Sox minor league system. In 1995, he was ranked the club's 6th-best prospect by Baseball America after going 11-3 with a 2.36 ERA for the GCL Red Sox and Sarasota Red Sox the year before. After going 11-7 with a 3.09 ERA in 27 starts for the Trenton Thunder in 1995, he was named Boston's 9th-best prospect for 1996. His career soon soured, however, and he was out of the minor leagues after the 1997 season. He was 32-29 with a 4.70 ERA in 100 career games (81 starts) at that level.

Japan
Orellano signed with the Nippon Ham Fighters for 1998 and appeared in 14 games for the club that year, going 1-3 with a 7.50 ERA in 14 games (4 starts). In 30 innings, he allowed 29 walks and struck out 22 batters. In 1999, he was 1-5 with a 4.99 ERA in 21 games (5 starts) and in 2000, he made a single appearance, allowing two walks, one hit and an earned run in 1/3 of an inning. Overall, he went 2-8 with 58 walks, 49 strikeouts and a 6.17 ERA in 36 games (9 starts) in his NPB career.

Personal life
He was born in Humacao, Puerto Rico.

References

Living people
1973 births
Gulf Coast Red Sox players
Nippon Professional Baseball pitchers
Nippon Ham Fighters players
Sarasota Red Sox players
Pawtucket Red Sox players
People from Humacao, Puerto Rico
Puerto Rican expatriate baseball players in Japan
Trenton Thunder players
Utica Blue Sox players